The C branch, also called the Beacon Street Line or Cleveland Circle Line, is one of four branches of the Massachusetts Bay Transportation Authority's Green Line light rail system in the Boston, Massachusetts metropolitan area. The line begins at Cleveland Circle in the Brighton neighborhood of Boston and runs on the surface through Brookline along the median of Beacon Street. Reentering Boston, the line goes underground through the St. Mary's Street incline and joins the B and D branches at Kenmore. Trains run through the Boylston Street subway to Copley where the E branch joins, then continue through the Tremont Street subway to downtown Boston. The C branch has terminated at Government Center station since October 2021.

, service operates on 7.5 minute headways at weekday peak hours and 9 to 10-minute headways at other times, using 8 to 12 trains (16 to 24 LRVs).

History

The first tracks on Beacon Street were laid in 1888, running from Massachusetts Avenue west to Coolidge Corner. The next year the rest of the line to Cleveland Circle opened, with access to the Reservoir carhouse. In 1889, the first electric streetcar route (see Green Line A branch) used Beacon Street from Coolidge Corner east to Massachusetts Avenue, then ran south on Massachusetts Avenue and east on Boylston Street to Park Square. That same year, the line on Beacon Street to Cleveland Circle was electrified.

The Boylston Street subway opened on October 3, 1914 as a westward extension of the Tremont Street subway. The Beacon Street line entered just east of Kenmore Square.

On November 21, 1914, rush hour Washington Street service was cut back to Reservoir, leaving only Beacon Street cars using the Chestnut Hill Avenue tracks. Beacon Street service was cut to Reservoir on November 6, 1915, with Washington Street service extended back to Lake Street. Beginning on February 6, 1922, all Washington Street service was operated as a Brookline Village–Lake Street shuttle as part of service changes on the Huntington Avenue line. The Washington Street shuttle was converted to bus on April 24, 1926. It was redirected to Brighton Center on June 23, 1928, and eventually became route 65.

This resulted in -minute rush-hour headways on the inner part of the line, with three-car Washington Square–Lechmere trains and two-car Cleveland Circle–Park Street trains on alternating 5-minute headways. The Washington Street service was cut back to Kenmore in June 1930 but resumed that September.

On February 7, 1931, Commonwealth Avenue and Beacon Street service was extended from Park Street to Lechmere using three-car trains; the Washington Street short turns were cut back to Kenmore–Park Street shuttles. On October 23, 1932, a westward extension of the subway was opened with an underground Kenmore station. The first use of two-car trains of PCC streetcars on the system was on the Beacon Street line on April 16, 1945. At that time, service on the line operated every 2.8 minutes at morning peak, 6 minutes midday, and 2.7 minutes in the afternoon peak. The first use of a three-car train of PCC cars was on July 13, 1946 for a baseball extra; they entered regular service on September 16, 1946. From 1940 until its 1967 naming as the C branch, the Beacon Street line had route number 61.

The Riverside Line (later the D branch) was connected to the Beacon Street tunnel near Mountfort Street, with service beginning on July 4, 1959. From June 8 to September 11, 1974, D branch trains ran over the C branch due to track work. Trains used a temporary loop at Reservoir and non-revenue tracks on Chestnut Hill Avenue to cross between the two lines. From March 20 to June 25, 1976, C branch night service looped at Kenmore to allow electrical work in the central subway.

Boeing LRVs were first used on the line on January 20, 1978. By March 24, three-car trains of PCC streetcars were no longer used on the C branch; all service was two-car trains of PCCs or LRVs. From June to September 1979, all service on the line was with PCCs due to LRV maintenance issues. The line was cut back to Government Center except at rush hour from March 21 to June 21, 1980, and cut back to Park Street non April 4, 1981. The line was extended to Government Center on June 26, 1982, with LRVs providing all service.

From July 24 to September 10, 1982, the line was replaced by buses to allow for track replacement. Four stops were permanently closed to speed travel times. Service was extended to North Station on July 30, 1983; this was the terminal until a cut to Government Center on March 29, 1997. It was extended again to North Station on January 1, 2005. The C branch was cut to Government Center on October 24, 2021, as part of changes in preparation for the opening of the Green Line Extension later in the year.

All C branch service was replaced with buses from July 5 to August 1, 2020, to allow for track and platform work. Eleven grade crossings,  of track, and the crossover at Cleveland Circle were replaced as part of the work, and all jointed track was welded together. C branch service was replaced by buses from July 11 to 22, 2022, to allow for trackwork and installation of train protection system equipment. From August 6–20, 2022, some C branch service was extended to  while the E branch was closed for track work.

Accessibility

The introduction of low-floor LRVs in 2000 allowed for accessible service on the Green Line. In the early 2000s, the MBTA modified key surface stops with raised platforms as part of the Light Rail Accessibility Program. Portable lifts were installed at Coolidge Corner and Cleveland Circle around 2000. Four surface stops – , Coolidge Corner, and Cleveland Circle – were modified with raised platforms in 2002–03.

Track work in 2018–19, which included replacement of platform edges at several stops, triggered requirements for accessibility modifications at those stops. The short-term accessibility modifications at 14 B and C branch stops are expected to cost $57.5 million.

Traffic signals

The C branch runs on a dedicated median on Beacon Street in Brookline, with a total of 18 grade crossings at major cross streets. Like on its sister B branch, C branch streetcars must stop on traffic signals at street crossings. The signals on Beacon Street in Brookline could in theory be prioritized to make the Green Line run faster. However, the MBTA, which would be expected to pay for the streetcar sensors, does not consider the project to be cost-effective. In 2007, the Boston Globe published letters from riders who are in favor of these sensors, a letter from the MBTA spokesperson arguing that a major study is needed before the MBTA spends money, and a letter arguing that the T's spokesperson is giving too many excuses.

In January 2008, the MBTA hired a consultant to study the issue. , the Town of Brookline was considering formally asking the MBTA to cooperate in setting up traffic signal prioritization to speed up Green Line trains on Beacon Street.

In Mayor Marty Walsh's "Go Boston 2030" plan, prioritizing traffic signals on Beacon Street was a proposed idea. The plan indicated that the project is planned to be completed within five years.

Station listing

References

External links

 MBTA – Green Line C

Green Line (MBTA)
Railway lines opened in 1889